Jombola is a racket sport combining several features of other racket sports, similar to pickleball in United States. It was independently developed by Sukdev Singh from Malaysia in 2006.

History
Sukdev Singh, principal of Sri Dasmesh International School in Taman Bukit Pantai, Kuala Lumpur, Malaysia, conceived the game using a wooden racquet, balls made of foam, and a badminton court. The game uses a 15 points scoring system. He also planned to make Jombola as Olympics demonstration sport between 2028 to 2032.

As the game grown in popularity in the country, Jombola International Sdn Bhd was founded in 2010 to promote and manage the development of Jombola sport. The sports was introduced to Selangor state education department in 2014. Malaysian Ministry of Education included this sport under 1Student1Sport programme in 2017 for secondary schools. First Jombola open tournament was completed in November 2017.

Jombola was introduced to east Malaysian states of Sabah in 2020 and Sarawak in 2022.

See Also
Pickleball

References

Racket sports
Games and sports introduced in 2006
Sports originating in Malaysia
2006 establishments in Malaysia